The steroidogenic factor 1 (SF-1) protein  is a transcription factor involved in sex determination by controlling activity of genes related to the reproductive glands or gonads and adrenal glands. This protein is encoded by the NR5A1 gene, a member of the nuclear receptor subfamily, located on the long arm of chromosome 9 at position 33.3. It was originally identified as a regulator of genes encoding cytochrome P450 steroid hydroxylases, however, further roles in endocrine function have since been discovered.

Structure 
The NR5A1 gene encodes a 461-amino acid protein that shares several conserved domains consistent with members of the nuclear receptor subfamily. The N-terminal domain includes two zinc fingers and is responsible for DNA binding via specific recognition of target sequences. Variations of AGGTCA DNA motifs allows SF-1 to interact with the major groove of the DNA helix and monomerically bind. Following binding, trans-activation of target genes depends on recruitment of co-activators such as SRC-1, GRIP1, PNRC, or GCN5. Other critical domains of SF-1 include a proline-rich hinge region, ligand-binding domain, and a C-terminal activation domain for transcriptional interactions. A 30-amino acid extension of the DNA-binding domain known as the A-box stabilizes monomeric binding by acting as a DNA anchor. The hinge region can undergo post-transcriptional and translational modifications such as phosphorylation by cAMP-dependent kinase, that further enhance stability and transcriptional activity.

SF-1 is considered an orphan receptor as high-affinity naturally occurring ligands have yet to be identified.

Homology 
Analysis of mouse SF-1 cDNA revealed sequence similarities with Drosophila fushi tarazu factor I (FTZ-F1) which regulates the fushi tarazu homeobox gene. Several other FTZ-F1 homologs have been identified that implicate high level of sequence conservation among vertebrates and invertebrates. For example, SF-1 cDNA shares an identical 1017 base-pair sequence with embryonal long terminal repeat-binding protein (ELP) cDNA isolated from embryonal carcinoma cells, differing only in their terminal ends.

Expression

Adult steroidogenic tissue 
SF-1 expression is localized to adult steroidogenic tissues correlating with known expression profiles of steroid hydroxylases. Using in situ hybridization with SF-1 cRNA specific probe detected gene transcripts in adrenocortical cells, Leydig cells, and ovarian theca and granulosa cells. SF-1 specific antibody studies confirmed expression profile of SF-1 in rats and humans corresponding to sites of transcript detection.

Embryonic steroidogenic tissue 
Genetic sex in mammals is determined by the presence or absence of the Y chromosome at fertilization. Sexually dimorphic development of embryonic gonads into testes or ovaries is activated by the SRY gene product. Sexual differentiation is then directed by hormones produced by embryonic testes, the presence of ovaries, or complete absence of gonads. SF-1 transcripts initially localize to the urogenital ridge before SF-1 expressing cells resolve into distinct adrenocortical and gonadal precursors that ultimately give rise to adrenal cortex and gonads.

SF-1 transcripts precede the onset of SRY expression in the fetal testes hinting at gonadal developmental role. SRY influences the differentiation of the fetal testes into distinct compartments: testicular cords and interstitial region containing Leydig cells. Increase in SF-1 protein and detection in the steroidogenic Leydig cells and testicular cords coincides with development.

However, in the ovaries, gonadal sexual differentiation is facilitated by reductions in SF-1 transcript and protein. SF-1 levels is strongly expressed at the onset of follicular development in theca and granulosa cells which precedes expression of the aromatase enzyme responsible for estrogen biosynthesis.

Other sites 
Embryonic mouse SF-1 transcripts have been discovered to localize within regions of the developing diencephalon and subsequently in the ventromedial hypothalamic nucleus (VMH) suggesting roles beyond steroidogenic maintenance.

RT-PCR approaches have detected transcripts of mice FTZ-F1 gene in the placenta and spleen; and SF-1 transcripts in the human placenta.

Post-translational Regulation 
Transcription capacity of SF-1 can be influenced by post-translational modification. Specifically, phosphorylation of serine 203 is mediated by cyclin-dependent kinase 7. Mutations to CDK7 prevent interaction with the basal transcription factor, TFIIH, and formation of CDK-activating kinase complex. This inactivity has shown to repress phosphorylation of SF-1 and SF-1-dependent transcription.

Function 

SF-1 is a critical regulator of reproduction, regulating the transcription of key genes involved in sexual development and reproduction, most notably StAR and P450SCC. It can form a transcriptional complex with TDF  to up-regulate transcription of the Sox9 gene. Its targets include genes at every level of the hypothalamic-pituitary-gonadal axis, as well as many genes involved in gonadal and adrenal steroidogenesis.

SF-1 has been identified as a transcriptional regulator for an array of different genes related to sex determination and differentiation, reproduction, and metabolism via binding to their promoters. For example, SF-1 controls expression of Amh gene in Sertoli cells, whereby the presence or absence of the gene product affects development of Müllerian structures. Increased AMH protein levels leads to regression of such structures. Leydig cells express SF-1 to regulate transcription of steroidogenesis and testosterone biosynthesis genes causing virilization in males.

Target Genes

Steroidogenic cells 
First identified as a regulator of steroid hydroxylases within adrenocortical cells, studies aimed to define localization and expression of SF-1 have since revealed enzyme activity within other steroidogenic cells.

Sertoli cells 
The Müllerian inhibiting substance (MIS or AMH) gene within Sertoli cells contains a conserved motif identical to the optimal binding sequence for SF-1. Gel mobility shift experiments and use of SF-1-specific polyclonal antibodies established binding complexes of SF-1 to MIS, however, other studies suggest the MIS promoter is repressed and not activated by SF-1 binding.

Gonadotropes 
Gonadotrope-specific element, or GSE, in the promoter of the gene encoding α-subunit of glycoproteins (α-GSU) resembles the SF-1 binding sires. Studies have implicated SF-1 as an upstream regulator of a collection of genes required for gonadotrope function via GSE.

VMH 
SF-1 knockout mice displayed profound defects in the VMH suggesting potential target genes at the site. Target genes have yet to be identified due to difficulties in studying gene expression in neurons.

SF-1 Gene Knockout 
Several approaches used targeted gene disruption in mouse embryonic stem cells with the aim of identifying potential target genes of SF-1. The different targeting strategies include disruption to exons encoding for the zinc finger motif, disruption of a 3’-exon and targeted mutation of the initiator methionine.  The corresponding observed phenotypic effects on endocrine development and function were found to be quite similar.

Sf-1 knockout mice displayed diminished corticosterone levels while maintaining elevated ACTH levels. Observed morphological changes and DNA fragmentation was consistent with apoptosis and structural regression resulting in the death of all mice within 8 days after birth.

Sf-1 function was determined to be necessary for development of primary steroidogenic tissue as evidenced by complete lack of adrenal and gonadal glands in the knockout. Male to female sex reversal of genitalia was also observed.

Clinical significance 

Mutations in NR5A1 can produce intersex genitals, absence of puberty, and infertility. It is one cause of arrest of ovarian function in women <40 years of age, which occurs in 1% of all women.

Adrenal and gonadal failure 
Two SF-1 variants associated with primary adrenal failure and complete gonadal dysgenesis have been reported as caused by NR5A1 mutations. One reported case was found to have de novo heterozygous p.G35E change to the P-box domain. The affected region allows for DNA binding specificity through interactions with regulatory response elements of target genes. This p.G35E change may have a mild competitive or dominant negative effect on transactivation resulting in severe gonadal defects and adrenal dysfunction. Similarly, homozygous p.R92Q change within the A-box interfered with monomeric binding stability and reduced functional activity. This change requires mutations to both allele to display phenotypic effects as heterozygous carriers showed normal adrenal function.

Missense, in-frame and frameshift mutations of NR5A1 have been found in families with 46,XY disorders of sex development, 46,XX gonadal dysgenesis and 46,XX primary ovarian insufficiency. 46,XY individuals may have ambiguous or female genitals. Individuals of either karyotype may not enter puberty, although expression of the phenotype, penetrance, fertility, and modes of inheritance can vary. Some mutations are dominant, some are recessive.

46, XY disorders of sex development 
Heterozygous NR5A1 changes are emerging as a frequent contributor in 46, XY complete gonadal dysgenesis. In affected individuals, sexual development does not match their chromosomal makeup. Males, despite having 46, XY karyotype, develop female external genitalia, as well as uterus and fallopian tubes, along with gonadal defects rendering them nonfunctional. NR5A1 mutations have also been linked to partial gonadal dysgenesis, whereby affected individuals have ambiguous genitalia, urogenital sinus, absent or rudimentary Müllerian structures, and other abnormalities.

Typically, these genetic changes are frameshift, nonsense, or missense mutations that alter DNA-binding and gene transcription. While many are de novo, one-third of cases have been maternally inherited in a similar manner as X-linked inheritance. Furthermore, one report of homozygous missense mutation p.D293N within the ligand-binding domain of SF-1 revealed autosomal recessive inheritance was also possible.

Infertility 
Analysis of NR5A1 in men with non-obstructive male factor infertility found those with gene changes had more severe forms of infertility and lower testosterone levels. These changes affected the hinge region of SF-1. It is important to note further studies are required to establish the relationship between SF-1 changes and infertility.

Additional  Interactions 

SF-1 has also been shown to interact with:
 Beta-catenin
 DAX1
 NRIP1
 SOX9
 TRERF1.

References

Further reading

External links 
  GeneReviews/NCBI/NIH/UW entry on 46,XY Disorder of Sex Development and 46,XY Complete Gonadal Dysgenesis
 OMIM entries on 46,XY Disorder of Sex Development and 46,XY Complete Gonadal Dysgenesis
 

Intracellular receptors
5